Events in the year 2022 in Guinea.

Incumbents 

 President: Mamady Doumbouya
 Prime Minister: Mohamed Béavogui (until July 17); Bernard Gomou onwards

Events 
Ongoing – COVID-19 pandemic in Guinea

 January 2 – The United States cuts off Ethiopia, Guinea and Mali from the African Growth and Opportunity Act trade preference program citing their human rights abuses and anti-democratic actions.
 August 18 – A political organization in Guinea accuses military president Mamady Doumbouya of being behind the killings of two youths during anti-government protests yesterday.
 October 23 – 2021 Guinean coup d'état: ECOWAS confirms that Guinea's ruling junta has agreed to restore civilian rule in two years.

Deaths 

 January 12 – Aminata Touré, 69, Guinean politician, mayor of Kaloum

See also 

COVID-19 pandemic in Africa
National Assembly (Guinea)

References 

 
2020s in Guinea
Years of the 21st century in Guinea
Guinea
Guinea